Histone deacetylases (HDAC) are a class of enzymes that remove acetyl groups (O=C-CH3) from an ε-N-acetyl lysine amino acid on a histone, allowing the histones to wrap the DNA more tightly. This is important because DNA is wrapped around histones, and DNA expression is regulated by acetylation and de-acetylation.  Its action is opposite to that of histone acetyltransferase.  HDAC proteins are now also called lysine deacetylases (KDAC), to describe their function rather than their target, which also includes non-histone proteins.

HDAC super family 
Together with the acetylpolyamine amidohydrolases and the acetoin utilization proteins, the histone deacetylases form an ancient protein superfamily known as the histone deacetylase superfamily.

Classes of HDACs in higher eukaryotes 
HDACs, are classified in four classes depending on sequence homology to the yeast original enzymes and domain organization:

HDAC (except class III) contain zinc and are known as Zn2+-dependent histone deacetylases. They feature a classical arginase fold and are structurally and mechanistically distinct from sirtuins (class III), which fold into a Rossmann architecture and are NAD+ dependent.

Subtypes 
HDAC proteins are grouped into four classes (see above) based on function and DNA sequence similarity.  Class I, II and IV are considered "classical" HDACs whose activities are inhibited by trichostatin A (TSA) and have a zinc dependent active site, whereas Class III enzymes are a family of NAD+-dependent proteins known as sirtuins and are not affected by TSA. Homologues to these three groups are found in yeast having the names: reduced potassium dependency 3 (Rpd3), which corresponds to Class I; histone deacetylase 1 (hda1), corresponding to Class II; and silent information regulator 2 (Sir2), corresponding to Class III. Class IV contains just one isoform (HDAC11), which is not highly homologous with either Rpd3 or hda1 yeast enzymes, and therefore HDAC11 is assigned to its own class. The Class III enzymes are considered a separate type of enzyme and have a different mechanism of action; these enzymes are NAD+-dependent, whereas HDACs in other classes require Zn2+ as a cofactor.

Evolution 
HDACs are conserved across evolution, showing orthologs in all eukaryotes and even in Archaea. All upper eukaryotes, including vertebrates, plants and arthropods, possess at least one HDAC per class, while most vertebrates carry the 11 canonical HDACs, with the exception of bone fish, which lack HDAC2 but appears to have an extra copy of HDAC11, dubbed HDAC12. Plants carry additional HDACs compared to animals, putatively to carry out the more complex transcriptional regulation required by these sessile organisms. HDACs appear to be deriving from an ancestral acetyl-binding domain, as HDAC homologs have been found in bacteria in the form of Acetoin utilization proteins (AcuC) proteins.

Subcellular distribution 
Within the Class I HDACs, HDAC 1, 2, and 3 are found primarily in the nucleus, whereas HDAC8 is found in both the nucleus and the cytoplasm, and is also membrane-associated.  Class II HDACs (HDAC4, 5, 6, 7 9, and 10) are able to shuttle in and out of the nucleus, depending on different signals.

HDAC6 is a cytoplasmic, microtubule-associated enzyme.  HDAC6 deacetylates tubulin, Hsp90, and cortactin, and forms complexes with other partner proteins, and is, therefore, involved in a variety of biological processes.

Function

Histone modification
Histone tails are normally positively charged due to amine groups present on their lysine and arginine amino acids. These positive charges help the histone tails to interact with and bind to the negatively charged phosphate groups on the DNA backbone. Acetylation, which occurs normally in a cell, neutralizes the positive charges on the histone by changing amines into amides and decreases the ability of the histones to bind to DNA. This decreased binding allows chromatin expansion, permitting genetic transcription to take place. Histone deacetylases remove those acetyl groups, increasing the positive charge of histone tails and encouraging high-affinity binding between the histones and DNA backbone. The increased DNA binding condenses DNA structure, preventing transcription.

Histone deacetylase is involved in a series of pathways within the living system. According to the Kyoto Encyclopedia of Genes and Genomes (KEGG), these are:

 Environmental information processing; signal transduction; notch signaling pathway PATH:ko04330
 Cellular processes; cell growth and death; cell cycle PATH:ko04110
 Human diseases; cancers; chronic myeloid leukemia PATH:ko05220

 

Histone acetylation plays an important role in the regulation of gene expression. Hyperacetylated chromatin is transcriptionally active, and hypoacetylated chromatin is silent.  A study on mice found that a specific subset of mouse genes (7%) was deregulated in the absence of HDAC1.  Their study also found a regulatory crosstalk between HDAC1 and HDAC2 and suggest a novel function for HDAC1 as a transcriptional coactivator.  HDAC1 expression was found to be increased in the prefrontal cortex of schizophrenia subjects, negatively correlating with the expression of GAD67 mRNA.

Histone modification in neurons

Neurons are electrically excitable cells within the nervous system and are organized together in circuits.

In hippocampal neurons in culture, when spontaneous electrical activity occurred it was sufficient to cause nuclear export of the histone deacetylase HDAC4.  Another histone deacetylase, HDAC5, was translocated to the cytoplasm after stimulation of calcium flux through synaptic NMDA receptors.

Of 4,407 proteins found in the nuclei of rat forebrain neurons in culture, after activation of the neurons, 2,860 changed in nuclear concentration due to nucleocytoplasmic shuttling or synthesis or degradation of the proteins.  After neuronal stimulation, of all proteins, HDAC4 had the largest concentration decrease, due to shuttling out of the nucleus.

A decrease in a HDAC would cause greater presence of acetylation on histone tails. Histone acetylation is associated with active transcription of genes, (see top figure in this section) and decrease in a histone deacetylase would have epigenetic effects by likely maintaining or increasing gene transcriptions.  The large decrease in HDAC4 after neuron activation may have a similarly large effect on neuronal function.

Non-histone effects
It is a mistake to regard HDACs solely in the context of regulating gene transcription by modifying histones and chromatin structure, although that appears to be the predominant function.  The function, activity, and stability of proteins can be controlled by post-translational modifications.  Protein phosphorylation is perhaps the most widely studied and understood modification in which certain amino acid residues are phosphorylated by the action of protein kinases or dephosphorylated by the action of phosphatases.  The acetylation of lysine residues is emerging as an analogous mechanism, in which non-histone proteins are acted on by acetylases and deacetylases.  It is in this context that HDACs are being found to interact with a variety of non-histone proteins—some of these are transcription factors and co-regulators, some are not.   Note the following four examples:
 HDAC6 is associated with aggresomes. Misfolded protein aggregates are tagged by ubiquitination and removed from the cytoplasm by dynein motors via the microtubule network to an organelle termed the aggresome.   HDAC 6 binds polyubiquitinated misfolded proteins and links to dynein motors, thereby allowing the misfolded protein cargo to be physically transported to chaperones and proteasomes for subsequent destruction. HDAC6 is important regulator of HSP90 function and its inhibitor proposed to treat metabolic disorders.
 PTEN is an important phosphatase involved in cell signaling via phosphoinositols and the AKT/PI3 kinase pathway.  PTEN is subject to complex regulatory control via phosphorylation, ubiquitination, oxidation and acetylation.  Acetylation of PTEN by the histone acetyltransferase p300/CBP-associated factor (PCAF) can repress its activity; on the converse, deacetylation of PTEN by SIRT1 deacetylase and, by HDAC1, can stimulate its activity.
 APE1/Ref-1 (APEX1) is a multifunctional protein possessing both DNA repair activity (on abasic and single-strand break sites) and transcriptional regulatory activity associated with oxidative stress.  APE1/Ref-1 is acetylated by PCAF; on the converse, it is stably associated with and deacetylated by Class I HDACs.  The acetylation state of APE1/Ref-1 does not appear to affect its DNA repair activity, but it does regulate its transcriptional activity such as its ability to bind to the PTH promoter and initiate transcription of the parathyroid hormone gene.
 NF-κB is a key transcription factor and effector molecule involved in responses to cell stress, consisting of a p50/p65 heterodimer.  The p65 subunit is controlled by acetylation via PCAF and by deacetylation via HDAC3 and HDAC6.
These are just some examples of constantly emerging non-histone, non-chromatin roles for HDACs.

Neurodegenerative diseases
Inherited mutations in the gene encoding FUS, an RNA/DNA binding protein, are causally linked to amyotrophic lateral sclerosis (ALS).  FUS has a pivotal role in the DNA damage response involving its direct interaction with histone deacetylase 1 (HDAC1).  ALS mutant FUS proteins are defective in the DNA damage response and in recombinational DNA repair, and also show reduced interaction with HDAC1.

Ataxia-telangiectasia is due to mutation in the Atm gene.  Wild-type Atm encodes a protein kinase employed in chromatin remodeling and in epigenetic alterations that are required for repairing DNA double-strand breaks.  Atm mutation causes neurons to accumulate nuclear histone deacetylase 4 (HDAC4) resulting in increased histone deacetylation and altered neuronal gene expression that likely contributes to the neurodegeneration characteristic of ataxia-telangiectasia.

HDAC inhibitors

Histone deacetylase inhibitors (HDIs) have a long history of use in psychiatry and neurology as mood stabilizers and anti-epileptics, for example, valproic acid. In more recent times, HDIs are being studied as a mitigator or treatment for neurodegenerative diseases. Also in recent years, there has been an effort to develop HDIs for cancer therapy. Vorinostat (SAHA) was FDA approved in 2006 for the treatment of cutaneous manifestations in patients with cutaneous T cell lymphoma (CTCL) that have failed previous treatments. A second HDI, Istodax (romidepsin), was approved in 2009 for patients with CTCL. The exact mechanisms by which the compounds may work are unclear, but epigenetic pathways are proposed. In addition, a clinical trial is studying valproic acid effects on the latent pools of HIV in infected persons.  HDIs are currently being investigated as chemosensitizers for cytotoxic chemotherapy or radiation therapy, or in association with DNA methylation inhibitors based on in vitro synergy. Isoform selective HDIs which can aid in elucidating role of individual HDAC isoforms have been developed.

HDAC inhibitors have effects on non-histone proteins that are related to acetylation.  HDIs can alter the degree of acetylation of these molecules and, therefore, increase or repress their activity.  For the four examples given above (see Function) on HDACs acting on non-histone proteins, in each of those instances the HDAC inhibitor Trichostatin A (TSA) blocks the effect.  HDIs have been shown to alter the activity of many transcription factors, including ACTR, cMyb, E2F1, EKLF, FEN 1, GATA, HNF-4, HSP90, Ku70, NFκB, PCNA, p53, RB, Runx, SF1 Sp3, STAT, TFIIE, TCF, YY1.

The ketone body β-hydroxybutyrate has been shown in mice to increase gene expression of FOXO3a by histone deacetylase inhibition.

Histone deacetylase inhibitors may modulate the latency of some viruses, resulting in reactivation. This has been shown to occur, for instance, with a latent human herpesvirus-6 infection.

Histone deacetylase inhibitors have shown activity against certain Plasmodium species and stages which may indicate they have potential in malaria treatment. It has been shown that HDIs accumulate acetylated histone H3K9/H3K14, a downstream target of class I HDACs.

See also 
Histone acetyltransferase (HAT)
Histone deacetylase inhibitor
Histone methyltransferase (HMT)
Histone-modifying enzymes
RNA polymerase control by chromatin structure

References

External links 
 
 Animation at Merck

EC 3.5.1